Opera is the third official Japanese single of South Korean boy band Super Junior, released on 9 May 2012 by Avex Trax. It was originally released in Korean as part of their fifth Korean studio album, Mr. Simple on 3 August 2011. This single set a new record as the most singles sold by a Korean artist in a week.

Background 
The song was originally written in English as "N.A.U.G.H.T.Y", by both Thomas Troelsen and Engelina Larsen. It was never released and re-written in Korean by Kenzie and became a part of the group's fifth studio album, "Mr. Simple" as the second track off its initial release.

Reception
On the day of released the single debut at number 3 on Oricon Daily Chart and sold 54,331 copies. The following day it sold an additional 15,608 copies. The single debuted at #3 on Oricon Weekly Chart, selling 159,789 copies on its first week of release, outselling their previous Japanese single Mr. Simple which sold 88,873 on its first week, making it Super Junior's highest-selling Japanese release and as the 2012 top selling Korean artist in Japan.

Track listing

CD
 "Opera"
 "Way"
 "Opera" - Korean ver. (Limited edition CD Only)

"CD+DVD" DVD track list
 "Opera"
 "Opera" - Dance ver. 
 Off Shot Clip

Charts and sales

Sales and certifications

References 

Super Junior songs
Korean-language songs
Japanese-language songs
2012 singles
SM Entertainment singles
Songs written by Thomas Troelsen
Songs written by Engelina
Avex Trax singles
2012 songs